Tom Love (born February 17, 1953) is an American businessman, educator, and politician who served as a member of the Kansas House of Representatives from 1991 to 1992. He was an unsuccessful candidate for Kansas's 3rd congressional district in the 2020 election, placing fifth in the Republican primary.

Outside of politics, Love has worked as an elementary school teacher and real estate investor in Overland Park, Kansas.

References 

Living people
1953 births
Businesspeople from Kansas
Educators from Kansas
Politicians from Overland Park, Kansas
Republican Party members of the Kansas House of Representatives
20th-century American politicians